Patrick Earth Mendes is an American-Brazilian weightlifter. He was the heavyweight USA national champion in 2011 and 2012.
He was suspended by the United States Anti-Doping Agency for two years (began March 19, 2012) for using human growth hormone. It has been reported that he tested positive for a banned substance a second time at the 2015 Pan Am Games.

References

American male weightlifters
Doping cases in weightlifting
Brazilian male weightlifters
Year of birth missing (living people)
Living people
Weightlifters at the 2015 Pan American Games
Pan American Games competitors for Brazil